The manga series  was first serialized in Afternoon and compiled into 19 volumes published by Kodansha, which started from October 23, 1993 to January 21, 2000 with the first three volumes sold for 509 Yen before the rest were sold for 530 Yen. Reprints came with 10 volumes in bunkoban from May 9, 2003 to September 12, 2003 for 798 Yen with another reprint in aizoban from February 23, 2009 to November 20, 2009 for 1,000 Yen. The North American version of the manga, retitled Ice Blade, was serialized in Tokyopop's MixxZine, but it was discontinued after three volumes. For France and French-speaking countries/territories, Génération Comics was the publisher before it was taken over by Panini Comics. For Italy, Stars Comics published all 19 volumes. In Germany and German-speaking countries and territories, Carlsen Comics was the publisher. In South Korea, Samyang Comics published Jiraishin in its entirety. In Taiwan, it was published by Tong Li Comics under the Youth Comic series label.

Jiraishin Diablo was serialized in good! Afternoon magazine and compiled in three volumes.

Jiraishin centers on a plainclothes police officer named Kyoya Ida, who is known to solve cases by using questionable methods with the point of using violence to resolve them while interacting with a bleak, dark world, sometimes with prices to pay. In Jiraishin Diablo, Ida had left the force for an undetermined period of time while suffering from the effects of Keratoconus after coming across a police detective assigned to Ishikawa and a grown up Aya Koike, who Ida had met back in the 1990s, while solving a case of unknown deaths in the fictional Amakura Island in Japan's Ishikawa Prefecture.

Manga Chapters

Jiraishin

Original

Bunko

Jiraishin Diablo

References

Jiraishin